Maksim Aleksandrovich Sukrutin (born 29 September 1987) is a former Russian professional football player.

Club career
He played in the Russian Football National League for FC Lada Togliatti in 2006.

External links
 
 

1987 births
Living people
Russian footballers
Association football midfielders
FC Lada-Tolyatti players
FC Sokol Saratov players
FC Sever Murmansk players